Henry Bertram Bucher (February 9, 1864 – October 29, 1944) was a Norwegian architect.

After studying under Ludvig Haslund and August Tidemand, Bucher studied at the Norwegian National Academy of Craft and Art Industry in Christiania and then at the Technical University of Berlin.

He established a practice in Christiania in 1887 and designed a number of residential buildings there, especially on the west side, as well as detached homes in what was still the separate municipality of Aker at the time. He also did work in Stavanger, Bergen, Fredrikstad, and Voss, and created a number of churches. He designed the West Norway Museum of Decorative Art in the Renaissance Revival style. His buildings often have a monumental character and draw inspiration from various styles (historicism). Like many architects, he also designed his own home, which he named Primavera.

Selected works 
 Huitfeldt Street (Huitfeldts gate) 14–16B, Oslo (1887)
 Riddervold Street (Riddervolds gate) 2, Oslo (1889–1890)
 Huitfeldt Street (Huitfeldts gate) 33, Oslo (1890)
 West Norway Museum of Decorative Art, Bergen (1891)
 Hammerfest Church (1891, burned in 1944)
 Sjåstad Church, Lier (1896)
 Gymnasium (Turnhallen), St. Olaf Street (St. Olavs gate) 25, Oslo (1897–1890; interior destroyed by fire in 1988, but facade preserved)
 Victoria Hotel, Stavanger (1900)
 Pleym Courtyard (Pleymgården), Aker Street (Akersgata) 11, Oslo (1906)
 National Archives magazine annex (now part of the National Museum of Art, Architecture and Design), Bank Square (Bankplassen) 3, Oslo (1911)
 Fredrikstad Customs House (1914–1915)
 Liabygda Church, Stranda (1917)
 Vodd High School (Voss landsgymnas) (1920)
 Ås Church, Vestre Toten (1921)
 Rail Toll Station (Jernbanetollstasjonen), Schweigaard Street (Schweigaards gate) 15, Oslo (1919−1923, collaboration with August Nielsen and Harald Sund)
 Raufoss Church, Vestre Toten (consecrated 1939)
 Kapp Church, Østre Toten (consecrated 1939)

References

Architects from Oslo
1864 births
1944 deaths